Alloeumyarion is an extinct genus of Cricetidae which existed in China during the early Miocene period. It was first named by Qiu Zhu-Ding in 2010, and the type species is Alloeumyarion sihongensis.

References

Miocene rodents
Fossils of China
Fossil taxa described in 2010
Muroid rodents
Miocene mammals of Asia